The 52nd Writers Guild of America Awards, given in 2000, honored the film and television best writers of 1999.

Film

Best Adapted Screenplay
 Election - Alexander Payne and Jim Taylor
The Cider House Rules - John Irving
The Insider - Michael Mann and Eric Roth
October Sky - Lewis Colick
The Talented Mr. Ripley - Anthony Minghella

Best Original Screenplay
 American Beauty - Alan Ball
Being John Malkovich - Charlie Kaufman
Magnolia - Paul Thomas Anderson
The Sixth Sense - M. Night Shyamalan
Three Kings - John Ridley and David O. Russell

Television

Best Episodic Comedy
 Merry Christmas, Mrs. Moskowitz - Frasier - Jay Kogen
The Paper Hat Anniversary - Dharma & Greg - Bill Prady, Eric Zicklin and Chuck Lorre
The One Where Everybody Finds Out - Friends - Alexa Junge
Four Women and A Hobo - Sex and The City - Jenny Bicks
Evolution - Sex and The City - Cindy Chupack

Best Episodic Drama
 Meadowlands - The Sopranos - Jason Cahill
The Storm, Part 1 - ER - John Wells
DWB - Law & Order - René Balcer
U.S. Male - Oz - Tom Fontana and Bradford Winters

Original Long Form
 Dash and Lily - Jerrold L. Ludwig
Freak City  - Jane Shepard
Aldrich Ames: Traitor Within - Michael Burton
Purgatory - Gordon T. Dawson

References
WGA - Previous award winners

1999
1999 film awards
1999 television awards
1999 awards in the United States
1999 in American cinema
1999 in American television
March 2000 events in the United States